Fernand Kolbeck (born 11 October 1944) is a French long-distance runner. He competed in the marathon at the 1972 Summer Olympics and the 1976 Summer Olympics.

References

External links
 

1944 births
Living people
Athletes (track and field) at the 1972 Summer Olympics
Athletes (track and field) at the 1976 Summer Olympics
French male long-distance runners
French male marathon runners
Olympic athletes of France
Paris Marathon male winners
20th-century French people